Caenimonas terrae  is a Gram-negative, strictly aerobic and curved rod-shaped bacterium from the genus of Caenimonas which has been isolated from soil from Suwon on Korea.

References

Comamonadaceae
Bacteria described in 2013